is a private junior college located in the city of Owariasahi, very close to the city of Nagoya in Aichi Prefecture, Japan. Originally established as a women's junior college in 1965, the school became coeducational in 2000.

External links
 Official website 

Educational institutions established in 1965
Private universities and colleges in Japan
Universities and colleges in Nagoya
Japanese junior colleges
1965 establishments in Japan